Salvatore Todaro was the name of at least two ships of the Italian Navy named in honour of Salvatore Todaro and may refer to:

 , a  launched in 1964 and stricken in 1994.
 , a  launched in 2003

Italian Navy ship names